Manfred Rieger (born 25 April 1941) is a retired German weightlifter. He competed in three consecutive Summer Olympics, as heavyweight in 1964 and 1968 and super heavyweight in 1972, and finished in eleventh, fourth and fifth place, respectively. Between 1966 and 1970 he won a bronze medal in the super heavyweight category at every European championship (the championships were not conducted in 1967).

References

External links

 

1941 births
Living people
German male weightlifters
Olympic weightlifters of the United Team of Germany
Olympic weightlifters of East Germany
Weightlifters at the 1964 Summer Olympics
Weightlifters at the 1968 Summer Olympics
Weightlifters at the 1972 Summer Olympics
European Weightlifting Championships medalists
People from Zittau
Sportspeople from Saxony